The given name Logan is derived from the Scottish surname Logan, which is in turn derived from a place name. The likely origin of this surname is a place located near Auchinleck, in Ayrshire. The place name is derived from the Scottish Gaelic lagan, which is a diminutive of lag, which in turn means "hollow". The given name is borne by males and females.

The given name was the 17th most popular name for baby boys born in the United States in 2007 and was the 455th most popular name for baby girls born there in 2007. It was the 54th most popular name for baby boys born in England and Wales in 2007 and was the 12th most popular name for boys born in Scotland in 2007 and the fourth most popular in 2009. It was also among the top 100 most popular names for boys in Canada, Australia, France and Belgium in the last five years. In 2017 it was the 5th most popular in the U.S., 3rd in Canada, 10th in Northern Ireland, and 6th in Scotland.

List of people with the given name "Logan" include

A
Logan Alexander (born 1986), Bermudian footballer
Logan Allen (born 1997), American baseball player
Logan Arens (born 1996), American actor
Logan Astley (born 2003), English rugby league footballer
Logan Austin (born 1995), Australian rules footballer

B
Logan Bailly (born 1985), Belgian footballer
Logan Baldwin (born 1996), American baseball player
Logan Bartholomew (born 1984), American actor
Logan Bayliss-Brow (born 1999), Scottish rugby league footballer
Logan Bearden (born 1995), American racing driver
Logan Beirne, American entrepreneur
Logan Edwin Bleckley (1827–1907), American lawyer and jurist
Logan Bolopue (born 1994), American motorcycle racer
Logan Bonner (born 1998), American football player
Logan Brill, American singer-songwriter
Logan Brown (born 1998), Canadian-American ice hockey player
Logan Browning (born 1989), American actress
Logan Bruss (born 1999), American football player
Logan Bye (born 1998), American ice dancer

C
Logan Campbell (disambiguation), multiple people
Logan Chalmers (born 2000), Scottish footballer
Logan Clark (born 1985), American mixed martial artist
Logan Clendening (1884–1945), American physician
Logan Cooke (born 1995), American football player
Logan Costa (born 2001), Cape Verdean footballer
Logan Couture (born 1989), Canadian ice hockey player
Logan Crowley (born 1996), New Zealand rugby union footballer
Logan Cunningham (disambiguation), multiple people
Logan Currie (born 2001), New Zealand cyclist

D
Logan Darnell (born 1989), American baseball player
Logan Davidson (born 1997), American baseball player
Logan Delaurier-Chaubet (born 2002), French footballer
Logan Dooley (born 1987), American gymnast
Logan Dorsey (born 2002), American soccer player
Logan Drake (1899–1940), American baseball player

E
Logan Easley (born 1961), American baseball player
Logan Edwards (born 1968), New Zealand rugby league footballer
Logan Emory (born 1988), American soccer player

F
Logan Ferland (born 1997), Canadian football player
Logan Fontaine (born 1999), French swimmer
Logan Forsythe (born 1987), American baseball player

G
Logan Gdula (born 1996), American soccer player
Logan George (born 1990), American film director
Logan Gilbert (born 1997), American baseball player
Logan Gillaspie (born 1997), American baseball player
Logan Giulietti-Schmitt (born 1985), American ice dancer
Logan Green (born 1983/1984), American entrepreneur
Logan Gray (born 1986), Scottish curler
Logan Guleff (born 2002), American television personality

H
Logan Hall (born 2000), American football player
Logan Hay (1871–1942), American lawyer and politician
Logan Henderson (born 1989), American actor and singer
Logan Henry, New Zealand rugby union footballer
Logan Hensley (1900–1971), American baseball player
Logan Hicks (born 1971), American artist
Logan Hitzeman (born 2001), American soccer player
Logan Howlett, Australian politician
Logan Huffman (born 1989), American actor
Logan Hutchings (born 1984), New Zealand cyclist

I
Logan Ice (born 1995), American baseball player

J
Logan James (born 1998), American professional wrestler

K
Logan Kanapathi, Canadian politician
Logan Kensing (born 1982), American baseball player
Logan Ketterer (born 1993), American soccer player
Logan Kilgore (born 1990), American football player

L
Logan Leistikow (born 1984), American filmmaker
Logan Lerman (born 1992), American actor
Logan Long (1878–1933), American politician
Logan T. Ludwig (born 1945/1946), American religious figure
Logan Lynn (born 1979), American musician

M
Logan MacMillan (born 1989), Canadian ice hockey player
Logan Mader (born 1970), Canadian guitarist
Logan Mailloux (born 2003), Canadian ice hockey player
Logan Mankins (born 1982), American football player
Logan Marshall (1883–1937), American author
Logan Marshall-Green (born 1976), American actor
Logan Martin (disambiguation), multiple people
Logan McCree (born 1977), American pornographic actor
Logan McDonald (born 2002), Australian rules footballer
Logan McGuinness (born 1987), Canadian boxer
Logan McMenamie, Canadian bishop
Logan Miller (born 1992), American actor
Logan Miller (soccer) (born 1992), American soccer player
Logan Misuraca (born 1999), American stock car racing driver
Logan Mitchell (disambiguation), multiple people
Logan Mize (born 1985), American singer-songwriter
Logan Morris (1889–1977), American judge
Logan Morrison (born 1987), American baseball player
Logan Mulvey (born 1984), American entrepreneur
Logan Murray, American comedian

N
Logan Ndenbe (born 2000), Belgian footballer
Logan Nelson (born 1996), American composer
Logan Nicoll, American politician

O
Logan O'Brien (born 1992), American actor
Logan O'Connor (born 1996), American ice hockey player
Logan O'Hoppe (born 2000), American baseball player
Logan Ondrusek (born 1985), American baseball player
Logan Owen (born 1995), American cyclist

P
Logan Waller Page (1870–1918), American academic administrator
Logan Panchot (born 1998), American soccer player
Logan Paul (born 1995), American social media personality
Logan Paulsen (born 1987), American football player
Logan Pause (born 1981), American soccer player
Logan Payne (born 1985), American football player
Logan Phillips (born 1982), American politician
Logan Powell (born 1999), Australian Paralympic swimmer

R
Logan Ramsey (1921–2000), American actor
Logan Richardson (born 1980), American musician
Logan Rogerson (born 1998), New Zealand footballer
Logan H. Roots (1841–1893), American politician
Logan Russell (born 1999), Bahamian footballer
Logan Ryan (born 1991), American football player

S
Logan Sama, English disc jockey
Logan Sandler, American writer
Logan Sankey (born 1998), American ski jumper
Logan Sargeant (born 2000), American racing driver
Logan Schafer (born 1986), American baseball player
Logan Seavey (born 1997), American stock car racing driver
Logan Shaw (born 1992), Canadian ice hockey player
Logan Shore (born 1994), American baseball player
Logan Sloane (1918–1980), New Zealand politician
Logan Pearsall Smith (1865–1946), American essayist
Logan Staats, Canadian singer-songwriter
Logan Stankoven (born 2003), Canadian ice hockey player
Logan Stanley (born 1998), Canadian ice hockey player
Logan Stenberg (born 1997), American football player
Logan Stephenson (born 1986), Canadian ice hockey player
Logan Stieber (born 1991), American wrestler
Logan Storley (born 1992), American mixed martial artist
Logan Stutz (born 1988), American basketball player
Logan Swann (born 1975), New Zealand rugby league footballer

T
Logan Tanner (born 2000), American baseball player
Logan Thomas (born 1991), American football player
Logan Thomas (film director) (born 1973), American film director
Logan Thompson (born 1997), Canadian ice hockey player
Logan Tom (born 1981), American volleyball player
Logan Trotter (born 1998), Scottish rugby union footballer

V
Logan van Beek (born 1990), New Zealand-Dutch cricketer
Logan Vander Velden (born 1971), American basketball player
Logan Archbold Vilas (1891–1976), American aviator

W
Logan Wade (born 1992), Australian baseball player
Logan Warmoth (born 1995), American baseball player
Logan Watkins (born 1989), American baseball player
Logan Webb (born 1996), American baseball player
Logan West (born 1994), American beauty queen
Logan Weston (born 1992), English cricketer
Logan Whitehurst (1977–2006), American musician
Logan Wilde (born 1976), American politician
Logan Wilson (born 1996), American football player
Logan Woodside (born 1995), American football player
Logan Wright (1933–1999), American psychologist
Logan Wyatt (born 1997), American baseball player

Y
Logan Young (1940–2006), American businessman
Logan Yuzna, American artist

Fictional characters
Logan (film series character), also known as Wolverine, a character in the film series X-Men
Logan Grimnar, a Space Marine from the Miniature wargame Warhammer 40k

See also
Logan (disambiguation), a disambiguation page for "Logan"
Logan (surname), a page for people with the surname "Logan"

References

English masculine given names
English unisex given names
English-language unisex given names
Masculine given names
Feminine given names
Given names originating from a surname